Harmony Grove High School is a comprehensive public high school that provides secondary education for students in grades seven through twelve; it is located in rural, distant unincorporated Ouachita County, Arkansas, United States, with a Camden postal address. The school is often referred to as Camden Harmony Grove High School, in reference to the postal designation, to distinguish this school from another of the same name within Arkansas. It is a part of the Harmony Grove School District.

Academics 
The assumed course of study for students follow the Smart Core curriculum developed by the Arkansas Department of Education (ADE). Students complete regular (core and elective) and career focus courses and exams and may select Advanced Placement (AP) coursework and exams that provide an opportunity for college credit. The school is accredited by the ADE and has been accredited by AdvancED since 1989.

Athletics 
The mascot and athletic emblem for Harmony Grove High School is the Hornet with black, gold and white serving as school colors.

For 2012–14 school years, the school participates in interscholastic competition within the 3A Classification and 3A-7 Conference administered by the Arkansas Activities Association (AAA) in such sports as football, golf (boys/girls), basketball, baseball, softball, track and field (boys/girls), and competitive cheer.

Notable alumni 
 Hal McAfee—Late American football coach and player.
 Tommy Tuberville (1972)—Current U.S. Senator for Alabama; American football coach and former player.
 Corey Williams—Tackle; National Football League player.

References

External links
 

Public high schools in Arkansas
Schools in Ouachita County, Arkansas
Buildings and structures in Camden, Arkansas